The Ethiopian thrush (Turdus simensis) is a species of bird in the family Turdidae. It is found in Eritrea and Ethiopia.

Taxonomy
The Ethiopian thrush was formally described in 1837 by the German naturalist Eduard Rüppell from a specimen collected in northern Ethiopia. He used the scientific name Merula (Turdus) simensis. The specific epithet is from the type locality, the Simien Mountains.

This thrush has sometimes been considered as a subspecies of the groundscraper thrush (Turdus litsitsirupa).

References

Turdus
Thrushes
Birds described in 1837